The Mar del Plata Sevens (Seven de Mar del Plata in Spanish) is an international rugby sevens competition played in Mar del Plata, Argentina since 1995. The tournament was one of the events in the World Rugby Sevens Series in 2000 and 2002.

Men's tournament

International 7s and World Series: 1995 to 2002 
Inspired by the success of Uruguay's Punta del Este Sevens, which hosted many of the world's best teams during the 1990s, the Argentine Rugby Union introduced an international tournament of their own in 1995. The inaugural Mar del Plata International Sevens
was won by New Zealand, defeating Fiji in a closely matched final by 26–21. In 2000, the tournament was included in World Sevens Series I, the first edition of the worldwide circuit for seven-a-side rugby. The following year Mar del Plata was host of the Rugby World Cup Sevens.

Key:<span style="border-left:3px solid #28368C;">Dark blue line: tournament included in the World Rugby Sevens Series.

Selected teams invitational event: 2003 onward 
After 2002, when no longer on the World Sevens circuit, the international sevens tournament at Mar del Plata was contested by invited national teams – mainly from the Americas but some further afield – as well as by selected and invitational sides (mostly representative teams from Argentina). 

During this era, the international tournament was sometimes hosted in conjunction with other competitions featuring national teams. This was the case in 2010 when the schedule included the Sudamérica Rugby Sevens, and teams from that tournament were joined by other select sides including from United States and South Africa to contest the Mar del Plata international sevens title. In 2015, Mar del Plata hosted a Pan American Games qualification event alongside the international sevens tournament.   

Winners since 2010 (details might not be complete):

Club and Invitational

Women's tournament
Winners since 2014 (details might not be complete):

Notes

References

External links
 Rugby Mar del Plata – website of the tournament host

 
Former World Rugby Sevens Series tournaments
Mar del Plata
International rugby union competitions hosted by Argentina
Rugby sevens competitions in South America
Recurring sporting events established in 2000